No. 445 Squadron RCAF was a short-lived post World War II squadron of the Royal Canadian Air Force.

The unit was formed in 1953 at CFB North Bay and equipped with CF-100 Canuck. It relocated to CFB Uplands shortly afterwards.

In 1956 No 445 relocated to RCAF Station Marville in France becoming an All-weather Fighter squadron. The squadron was disbanded in 1962 when the CF-100 were retired by the RCAF.

References

Canadian Forces aircraft squadrons
Military units and formations established in 1953
Royal Canadian Air Force squadrons (disbanded)